Sulamith may refer to:

People
Sulamith Goldhaber (1923–1965), high-energy physicist and molecular spectroscopist
Sulamith Ish-Kishor (1896–1977), American writer
Sulamith Isman (1925–1943), Dutch girl killed in Auschwitz
Sulamith Messerer (1908–2004), Russian ballerina and choreographer
Sulamith Wülfing (1901–1989), German artist and illustrator

In fiction
Sulamith in Paul Celan's 1948 poem "Death Fugue" ("")

See also
Shulamite

ru:Суламита